Staronizhestebliyevskaya is a rural locality (a stanitsa) in Krasnoarmeysky District of Krasnodar Krai, Russia. Population:

References

Rural localities in Krasnodar Krai